Werner Grundahl Hansen (22 August 1914 – 22 December 1952) was a Danish cyclist who won a bronze medal in the amateur's road race at the 1935 World Championships. After that he turned professional and competed both on the road and on track, winning a six-day race in his hometown of Copenhagen in 1936 and the national track pursuit title in 1939.

References 

1914 births
1952 deaths
Danish male cyclists
Cyclists from Copenhagen
20th-century Danish people